Me is the third studio album by Japanese singer Misono, released on June 30, 2010. The album was released in three different formats: CD only, CD+DVD, and a limited edition.

The album was preceded in release by seven singles.

Background
Me is the third studio album by Japanese pop/rock artist misono. The album became her first to be released under the pseudonym "Me." She would do this again for her following singles and next studio album, Uchi. Me debuted on the Oricon Albums Charts art #14, but dropped to #35 by the end of the first week, giving the album a weekly ranking at #20. The album dropped to #146 by the end of the second week before falling off the charts. The album was released as a standard CD, CD+DVD and a CD+DVD edition for her fan club. The fan club editions contained different material on the DVD portion, along with the "Dialogue" (Serifu / 台詞) version of the final track, "Last Time ~Romeo Juliet~."

The cover art for the album was in collaboration with Kitty Ex (KITTY EX) and designed by Garcia Marquez. The album contained very little new material, as had been the case with her previous albums Say -sei- (2008) and never+land (2007). For Me, there were three new tracks: "Usotsuki Tane" (ウソツキ種 / Liar Seed), "Joker" and "Last Time ~Romeo Juliet~."

Me contained the track "Tenbin ~Tsuyogari na Watashi×Yowagari na Kimi~," which was the coupling track on her collaboration single It's all Love!. "It's all Love!" had been performed with her sister Kumi Koda back in March 2009. The album also carried misono's most popular ballad "0-ji Mae no Tsunderella" (0時前のツンデレラ / Cinderella Before Midnight). The song was about the princess Cinderella hoping that the prince would find her and save her from her life with her stepmother and stepsisters. Her sister Kumi would later cover the song on her album Eternity ~Love & Songs~ released in October the same year.

Track listing

References

External links
Misono's Official Website (Discography)
YesAsia (CD Only)
YesAsia (CD+DVD)

2010 albums
Avex Group albums